Deewar-e-Shab is a 2019 Pakistani historical drama television series created and produced by Momina Duraid of MD Productions, and directed by Iqbal Hussain. It is the dramatization of the novel of the same name by Aliya Bukhari. The series has Nausheen Shah, Sarah Khan, Shehzad Sheikh, Shehroz Sabzwari Bushra Ansari, Asma Abbas, Kinza Hashmi, Anmol Baloch, Hira Soomro and Osama Tahir as leading actors while Zara Noor Abbas, Iqbal Ansari and Mohsin Abbas Haider also has an extended cameo appearance. The series  premiered from 8 June 2019 to 21 March 2020 on Hum TV.

Plot
Set in the early '90s when courtesans or Tawaifs are portrayed as classy women with etiquette but whom do not get involved in sexual activities. Sitara Jahan (Bushra Ansari) is well versed in the art of classical singing, music, and dance. She wants her daughters Feroza (Zara Noor Abbas) and Nagina (Nausheen Shah) to entertain her clients by singing and performing Mujra. Sitara wants to carry forward her family legacy with pride and doesn't view her craft in a negative light.

Nagina's life takes turn when Feroza runs away from Sitara Mahal; she eventually realizes that her family is falling apart and takes over Feroza's responsibilities to the best of her capabilities. Nagina has an extreme love-hate relationship with Faiz Ali (Mohsin Abbas Haider); a craftsman who is part of the family. Sitara Jahan especially takes care of him as he has no one in life. Faiz loves Nagina and on the contrary, Nagina hates him. As the story progress, Sitara forces Nagina to marry Faiz and she falls in love with him post-marriage. Later, she gives birth to her daughters Sandal (Hira Soomro) and Geeti-Aara (Sarah Khan) which returns Sitara Mehal's life to some happiness but it doesn't last for long. Faiz Ali passes away after the birth of his daughters leaving Nagina widowed and their daughters father-less.

Nagina is the driving force of Deewar-e-Shab; her journey goes through a transition with the next generation, her twin daughters, Sandal and Geeti-Aara.

Cast 
Shahzad Sheikh as Salar; Geti Ara's husband,  Step-son of Zartaj
Sarah Khan as Geti Ara; Nagina's daughter, Sitara Jahan's granddaughter, Sandal's twin sister 
Bushra Ansari as Sitara Jahan 
Asma Abbas as Dildar Begum
Kinza Hashmi as Joya Izhaar
Anmol Baloch as Rabiya Islam
Zainab Qayyum as Gul Naaz as Dildar's daughter
Shahroz Sabzwari as Khayyam Yousuf; Feroza's son & Sitara Jahan's grandson
Hira Soomro as Sandal; Nagina's daughter, Sitara Jahan's granddaughter, Geti Ara's twin sister
Saima Qureshi as Shaista
Hammad Shoaib as Nabeel
Osama Tahir as Maaz Islam
Tara Mahmood as Shaama
Mariam Mirza as Sameera Kamal, Yousuf's second wife
Syed Mohammad Ahmed as Ustaad Faraghat Baig
Amna Malik as Gul
Ayesha Toor as Zubia
Zara Noor Abbas as Feroza Jahan Yousuf's first wife, Khayyam's mother, Sitara's younger daughter (Episode 1–4)
Nausheen Shah as Nagina; Sitara Jahan's daughter
Mohsin Abbas Haider as Faiz Ali (Episode 1–5)
Saife Hassan as Afsar
Iqbal Hussain as Baali
Kamran Jilani as Islam
Saleem Mairaj as Izhaar
Shaheen Khan as Shakra
Faiq Khan as Salman Izhaar
Ayesha Rajput
Sarah Elahi as Almas
Shamayel Tareen as Zartaj
Raja Haider as Yousuf 
Akbar Khan
Zeeshan Khan
Sajid Shah
Talat Shah
Sabiha Hashmi as Izhaar and Islam's mother

Music 

 
The original soundtrack of the serial Kya Hai Ishq was composed by Sahir Ali Bagga while the lyrics were penned by Imran Raza. 
 
The OST was performed by Sahir Ali Bagga along with Manwa sister. 
 
The opening theme of the serial Deewar-e-Shab Ke Paar Hai Hum was performed by Beena Khan while lyrics were written by Sabir Zafar.

Track listing

Reception 
Initially, the show received positive reviews from the critics and received well ratings as well. Having 2.4 TRPs of first episode, 5.9 TRPs of fifth episode, 5.4 TRPs of eighth episode, it gained good ratings consistently.

Accolades

References

External links
Official website

Pakistani drama television series
2019 Pakistani television series debuts
2020 Pakistani television series endings
Urdu-language television shows
Hum TV original programming